Roy "Reg" Park (7 June 1928 – 22 November 2007) was an English bodybuilder, businessman, and actor. His first title was Mr Britain in 1949. He then won the Mr Universe in 1951, 1958 and 1965. He also starred in five films, four featured as Hercules, and in one, Hercules in the Haunted World (1961), he co-starred with Christopher Lee. Besides his own career and titles, he is probably best known as an idol and mentor to Arnold Schwarzenegger.

Biography

Roy Park was born in Leeds, West Yorkshire on 7 June 1928. Showing athletic interests early in life, Park dedicated his teenage years to excelling in football where he played in the reserves for Leeds United. He had no specific interest in bodybuilding until age 16 when he met muscleman David Cohen. Upon learning that Cohen lifted weights at his friend's house, Park joined in out of curiosity. Park's legendary physique would begin to grow from barbells, dumbbells and a simple chinning bar.

During his national service he was a Physical Training Instructor in Singapore. Upon discharge from the British Army in 1948, he witnessed his first physique contest; the inaugural NABBA Mr. Universe contest in London, in which John Grimek edged out Steve Reeves in controversial fashion. It was this contest that inspired Park to compete himself.

After one year of hard training, Park earned the title of Mr. Britain in 1949. He then subsequently spent six months in the United States (thanks to a gift from his parents). There, he met up with publisher Joe Weider, who began to feature the Englishman prominently in his muscle magazines. The next year, Park was runner-up to Steve Reeves in the 1950 NABBA Amateur Mr. Universe in London (also a close contest).

After a second full year of training, Park broke what had been an American monopoly on bodybuilding titles by winning the 1951 National Amateur Bodybuilders Association (NABBA) Amateur Mr. Universe. He cemented his status by winning the 1958 and 1965 NABBA Pro Mr. Universe titles. Standing 6'1" and with a top weight of 250 pounds, Park was known for his muscular mass and was a forerunner to modern bodybuilding. Park was also renowned for his strength, which he often demonstrated in contests and strongman exhibitions. He is on record as the second man to bench press 500 lbs, after Doug Hepburn. As an actor, Park made five films—all Italian Hercules sword and sandal pictures.

Up to the time of his illness in 2007, despite being in his seventies, Park continued to train clients at the Morningside Virgin Active Gym in Sandton, South Africa. He has been featured in many fitness and bodybuilding magazines, and has also appeared on the cover of Muscle & Fitness. He was inducted into the International Federation of Bodybuilders (IFBB) IFBB Hall of Fame's first ballot in 1999.

Death and legacy
With his wife of 55 years, Mareon, and children Jeunesse and Jon Jon by his side, Park died on 22 November 2007 in his home in South Africa, after an eight-month battle with metastatic melanoma (a form of skin cancer). Park's legacy is continued by his son Jon Jon Park, a personal trainer and former Olympic swimmer. Reg Park raised and trained Jon Jon in South Africa. Today Jon Jon Park is the owner of the Legacy Gym, a popular gymnasium in West Los Angeles. Reg's daughter, Jeunesse, founded Food & Trees for Africa, a non profit that changed thousands of lives and landscapes.

Famous for his mass and strength, Reg Park was an early influence and lifelong mentor to champion bodybuilder Arnold Schwarzenegger. Schwarzenegger said that he was inspired to become a bodybuilder after seeing Park. For three years in the 1960s Schwarzenegger was trained by Wag Bennett in his gym in the East End of London, and it was there where he met his idol, Reg Park. Bonus footage from the DVD release of the classic documentary film Pumping Iron (1977) features Park mentoring Schwarzenegger. Park can also be heard performing the Master of Ceremonies duties in the Mr. Universe and Mr. Olympia contests featured in the film proper.

Bodybuilding titles
1946 Mr Britain 4th
1949 Mr Britain 1st
1950 Best Developed Athlete in America - IFBB, Tall, 1st
1950 Best Developed Athlete in America - IFBB, Overall Winner Mr Europe
1950 Overall Winner Mr Universe - NABBA, Tall, 2nd
1951 Mr Universe - NABBA, Tall, 1st
1951 Mr Universe - NABBA, Overall Winner
1958 Mr Universe - Pro - NABBA, Tall, 1st
1958 Mr Universe - Pro - NABBA, Overall Winner
1965 Mr Universe - Pro - NABBA, Tall, 1st
1965 Mr Universe - Pro - NABBA, Overall Winner
1970 Mr Universe - Pro - NABBA, Tall, 2nd
1971 Mr Universe - Pro - NABBA, Tall, 3rd
1973 Mr Universe - Pro - NABBA, Tall, 2nd

Competitive stats
 Height: 6'1" (185 cm)
 Contest weight: 214-222 lbs (97–101 kg)
 Off-season  weight: 225-250 lbs (102–113 kg)
 Arms: 18.5 @ 215 lbs, 19.0 @ 230 lbs" (47–48 cm)

Filmography
Ercole Alla Conquista Di Atlantide (1961) Italy. aka Hercules Conquers Atlantis (1962 UK title) Hercules and the Captive Women (1963 US title)
Ercole Al Centro Della Terra (1961) Italy. aka Hercules in the Centre of the Earth (1962 UK title) and Hercules in the Haunted World (1963 US title) co-starring Christopher Lee
Maciste Nelle Miniere Di Re Salomone (1964) Italy. aka Maciste in King Solomon's Mines (1964)
Ursus, Il Terrore Dei Kirghisi (1964). Italy. aka Hercules, Prisoner of Evil (1964)
Sfida Dei Giganti (1965) Italy. aka Hercules the Avenger (1965)

See also
List of male professional bodybuilders
List of female professional bodybuilders

References

External links
 Obituary in The Times, 27 November 2007

 Reg's personal site
 Reg's fan tribute
  A great collections of articles of Reg Park 
Interview of Reg Park for LEXNEWS MAGAZINE
 The Reg Park Story
 Reg Park “Mr. Universe”

1928 births
2007 deaths
British bodybuilders
Deaths from cancer in South Africa
Deaths from melanoma
English bodybuilders
English expatriates in Italy
English male film actors
People associated with physical culture
Professional bodybuilders
Military personnel from Leeds
20th-century British Army personnel
Royal Army Physical Training Corps soldiers